Brandy Erholtz ( born 22 August 1977) is a former American female mountain runner, world champion at the World Long Distance Mountain Running Championships (2010).

Biography
Erholtz won others three medals (two gold) with the national team at the World Long Distance Mountain Running Championships.

She won twice Mount Washington Road Race (2008 and 2009) and three times the NACAC Mountain Running Championships (2010. 2012, 2014).

References

External links
 
 Brandy Erholtz at Association of Road Racing Statisticians

1977 births
Living people
People from International Falls, Minnesota
Sportspeople from Minnesota
American female long-distance runners
American female mountain runners
World Long Distance Mountain Running Championships winners
21st-century American women